Carol Owens (born 4 June 1971) is a former New Zealand-based squash player who won the World Open in 2000 and 2003.

Owens was born in Melbourne, Australia, and would eventually change her nationality when she moved to Auckland, New Zealand. A right-hander, she made her competitive debut in 1990 in the Swiss Open where she finished 17th. Her first final was the 1993 Japan Open where she was a runner-up to the Canadian Heather Wallace. She didn't have to wait long for her first major victory, which came in October in Adelaide, South Australia.

She was part of the Australian winning team at the 1994 Women's World Team Squash Championships, 1996 Women's World Team Squash Championships and 1998 Women's World Team Squash Championships.

She has the unique achievement of representing both Australia and New Zealand at the highest level and is the first female player to win medals for two countries at the Commonwealth Games.

Carol began to challenge for the world championship whilst still representing Australia and her first World Open title came in 2000 when she beat New Zealander Leilani Joyce 7–9, 3–9, 10–8, 9–6, 9–1. This was after an equally epic semi-final against Sarah Fitz-Gerald.

In 2001 Carol changed nationality becoming a New Zealander and at the 2002 Commonwealth Games she won the gold in the doubles and a silver in the singles. The elusive second world title came in 2003, when she beat Cassie Campion 3–9, 9–2, 9–7, 9–3. It was in 2003 that she became – for the first time – the World No. 1 ranked player.

At the beginning of 2004, Carol announced that she had retired from the professional game.

World Open

Finals: 2 (2 title, 0 runners-up)

World Team Championships

Finals: 3 (3 title, 0 runner-up)

See also
 List of WISPA number 1 ranked players
 Official Women's Squash World Ranking

References

External links 
 
 Carol Owens at SquashPics.com (archived)
 
 Profile at the New Zealand Olympic Committee website

Australian emigrants to New Zealand
New Zealand female squash players
1971 births
Living people
Commonwealth Games gold medallists for New Zealand
Commonwealth Games silver medallists for New Zealand
Sportspeople from Auckland
Sportswomen from Victoria (Australia)
Squash players at the 2002 Commonwealth Games
Sportspeople from Melbourne
Commonwealth Games bronze medallists for Australia
Squash players at the 1998 Commonwealth Games
Australian female squash players
Commonwealth Games medallists in squash
Medallists at the 1998 Commonwealth Games
Medallists at the 2002 Commonwealth Games